Portofino Tower is a residential skyscraper in Miami Beach, Florida. South Beach. It is located on the southern extremity of the city overlooking Government Cut. Portofino, which opened in 1997, is 484 ft (148 m) tall and contains 44 floors.  It is located in the "SOFI" (South of Fifth Street) neighbourhood.

It is the fourth tallest skyscraper in Miami Beach.

Developed by Thomas Kramer's Portofino Group in partnership with The Related Group, Portofino Tower was South of Fifth's second luxury skyscraper condominium.

Amenities include a swimming pool, tennis courts, fitness center, full-time concierge service, recreation room, and four-story lobby.

Because of Portofino Tower's high profile and high-security accommodations, the building has become the home of multiple national and international celebrities. Famous current and former residents include: Donald Sutherland, Sir Ivan, Ingrid Casares, Anna Kournikova and Isabella S.

See also
List of tallest buildings in Miami Beach

References

Residential buildings completed in 1997
Residential skyscrapers in Miami Beach, Florida
1997 establishments in Florida